Pars is a surname. Notable people with the surname include:

 Asım Pars (born 1976), Bosnian-Turkish basketball player
 Heino Pars (1925–2014), Estonian animated film director
 Kenan Pars (born 1920), Turkish-Armenian actor
 Krisztián Pars (born 1982), Hungarian athlete
 William Pars (1742–1782), English painter